Sarbia may refer to:
 Sarbia (skipper), a genus of butterfly

Places 
Sarbia, Czarnków-Trzcianka County in Greater Poland Voivodeship (west-central Poland)
Sarbia, Szamotuły County in Greater Poland Voivodeship (west-central Poland)
Sarbia, Wągrowiec County in Greater Poland Voivodeship (west-central Poland)
Sarbia, Lubusz Voivodeship (west Poland)
Sarbia, West Pomeranian Voivodeship (north-west Poland)